Laurelvale Football Club is an intermediate-level football club with its first team playing in the Intermediate B division and second team playing in the Reserve Division 2 of the Mid-Ulster Football League in Northern Ireland. The club is based in the rural village of Laurelvale, County Armagh. 

In their 25th anniversary year (2005–06 Season), Laurelvale enjoyed a strong season, winning the Intermediate League in addition to the Marshall Cup.  The County Armagh club also reached the last 16 in the Irish Intermediate Cup and claimed the scalps of senior Irish Premier League sides, Armagh City and Loughgall (31-01-06) on their way to the semi-final of the Mid-Ulster Cup, where they lost to Glenavon. 

In the following season, Laurelvale added the Premier Cup to their trophy cabinet meaning all three trophies were held by Laurelvale.  Mark Robinson's second team also enjoyed success by winning the Mid Ulster Reserve League Division 3 with a thrilling final day climax.  There was also success on a great scale when the first team made it to the fifth round of the Irish Cup.

In the 2011-2012 season The Vale got hit by their first relegation to the second tier. After a horrendous start to the season despite the best efforts of caretaker boss Trevor Grant he was unable to stop this ship from sinking.

For the 2012-2013 season, Mark Robinson was back at the helm to try and get the team back into the top tier but could only manage an 11th place finish. The next season the league form did improve with the club finishing mid-table, but the real achievement was in the Mid-Ulster Cup where the team came up against Irish Premier League side, Glenavon and only narrowly losing 1-0.

After a few mediocre years Mark Robinson freshened up his backroom staff bringing in Darragh Pedan at the beginning of the 2016-2017 season. Not much improvement came for The Vale though with another lacklustre season, finishing 11th. On 9 June 2017, everyone at the club with was dealt a heart-wrenching blow with the passing of lifetime supporter and club legend Sid Wright. This led to the renaming of the ground in the future. With a high turnover of players during the summer, signing 9 players, there was a confidence within the club that it could be a successful season. Starting the season strong reaching the 3rd round of the Irish Cup, falling to Moyola Park, as well as sitting top of the table. Adding another two players to see them over the line and return to the top tier on the second last day of the season beating Seagoe 1-0. On the final day of the season when the team lifted the trophy, they revealed a banner reading 'WE DID IT FOR SID'. 

Upon the return to Intermediate 'A' football, The Vale lost coach Darragh Peden who was instrumental in the title winning season, who was replaced by ex-Crusaders player Sid Burrows. Despite adding two experienced faces to the squad, the team was overwhelmed by the step up in quality and just about survived the drop finishing 12th. As for the 2019-2020 season, The Vale was saved by the bell more or less with the team sat rock bottom when the league was suspended due to the COVID-19 pandemic. Sid Burrows left the club and was replaced by George McAllister at the beginning of the 2019-2020 season.

The COVID-19 pandemic allowed Mark Robinson to bow out with the club still an Intermediate 'A' outfit and a project waiting to be took on. This project was attacked by ex-Portadown centre forward Gary Millar. Millar brought with him Robin Carson as his assistant as well as Matthew Hollis, Aaron Dowey and club legend Gareth Thornbury joining the coaching staff. With training and matches interrupted Millar left his post after only 9 games in charge with the club promoting his assistant Robin Carson to manager. Gareth Thornbury also left the club. 

Carson was dealt a bad hand for his first job and had a mountain to climb but even with the hard work of the staff and players the team found themselves heading back down to the second tier after finishing 15th. Aaron Dowey left the club at the end of the season.

At the start of the 2022-2023 season, Carson added some experience to his backroom team adding Trevor Grant for the upcoming Intermediate 'B' season.

Club colours
The club take its club colours from the famous English football club Newcastle United.

Honours

Intermediate honours
Mid-Ulster Football League: 2
2002–03, 2005–06
Mid Ulster Intermdiate B
2018-19

References

External links

 Daily Mirror Mid-Ulster Football League Official website
 nifootball.co.uk - (For fixtures, results and tables of all Northern Ireland amateur football leagues)

Association football clubs in Northern Ireland
Association football clubs established in 1981
Association football clubs in County Armagh
Mid-Ulster Football League clubs